Harpendyreus is a genus of butterflies in the family Lycaenidae.

Species
Harpendyreus aequatorialis (Sharpe, 1892)
Harpendyreus argenteostriata Stempffer, 1961
Harpendyreus berger Stempffer, 1976
Harpendyreus boma (Bethune-Baker, 1926)
Harpendyreus hazelae Stempffer, 1973
Harpendyreus juno (Butler, 1897)
Harpendyreus kisaba (Joicey & Talbot, 1921)
Harpendyreus major (Joicey & Talbot, 1924)
Harpendyreus marlieri Stempffer, 1961
Harpendyreus marungensis (Joicey & Talbot, 1924)
Harpendyreus meruana (Aurivillius, 1910)
Harpendyreus noquasa (Trimen & Bowker, 1887)
Harpendyreus notoba (Trimen, 1868)
Harpendyreus reginaldi Heron, 1909
Harpendyreus tsomo (Trimen, 1868)

External links
"Harpendyreus Heron, 1909" at Markku Savela's Lepidoptera and some other life forms
Seitz, A. Die Gross-Schmetterlinge der Erde 13: Die Afrikanischen Tagfalter. Plate XIII 73

 
Lycaenidae genera